The year 1912 in architecture involved some significant architectural events and new buildings.

Events
 Clough Williams-Ellis receives his first major architectural commission, for the remodelling of Llangoed Hall in Wales.

Buildings and structures

Buildings opened

 Electric Tower, in Buffalo, New York, designed by Esenwein & Johnson
 April 19 – Bridges in Constantine, Algeria:
 Sidi M'Cid Bridge, designed by Ferdinand Arnodin.
 Sidi Rached Bridge, designed by Paul Séjourné.
 April 25 – Rebuilt St Mark's Campanile in Venice inaugurated.
 May – Pushkin Museum of Fine Arts opens in Moscow, Russia.
 June – Government Conference Centre, Ottawa, Ontario, Canada (opened by the Grand Trunk Railway as Ottawa's railway station)
 October 12 – Quarr Abbey on the Isle of Wight (England), designed by Dom Paul Bellot, consecrated.
 December 26 – Opening of:
 Manchester Opera House, in Manchester, England, as the New Theatre, designed by Richardson & Gill with Farquarson.
 St. James Theatre, Wellington, New Zealand, designed by Henry Eli White.

Buildings completed

 Alexander Nevsky Cathedral, Sofia, Bulgaria.
 Mysore Palace, India, designed by Henry Irwin.
 El Centro Español de Tampa, Florida, USA.
 Mawson's Huts, Cape Denison, Commonwealth Bay, Australian Antarctic Territory
 Šaloun's Villa in Prague, designed by and for sculptor Ladislav Šaloun.
 The Salutation, Sandwich, Kent, England, designed by Edwin Lutyens with garden by Gertrude Jekyll.
 Sons of Norway Hall, Petersburg, Alaska, USA.
 Glamorgan County Hall, Cardiff, Wales, designed by Vincent Harris and T. A. Moodie.
 Chengyang Bridge, China.
 Jackson Tower in Portland, Oregon
 The Fairmont Copley Plaza Hotel in Boston, Massachusetts
 Sun Tower in Vancouver, British Columbia, Canada
 Montreal Museum of Fine Arts in Montreal, Quebec, Canada
 Ritz-Carlton Montreal in Montreal, Quebec, Canada

Awards
 Olympic gold medal – Eugène Monod & Alphone Laverrière of Switzerland for Building plan of a modern stadium.
 RIBA Royal Gold Medal – Basil Champneys.
 Grand Prix de Rome, architecture: Jacques Debat-Ponsan.

Births

 January 9 – Ralph Tubbs, British architect associated with the Festival of Britain (died 1996)
 January 30 – Finn Juhl, Danish architect, interior and industrial designer (died 1989)
 February 21 – Henry Bernard, French architect, designer of the Palace of Europe (died 1994)
 March 12 – Gordon Tait, British architect (died 1999)
 June 11 – Rosemary Stjernstedt, British architect (died 1998)
 December 1 – Minoru Yamasaki, American World Trade Center architect (died 1986)
 December 15 – Ray Eames, American designer, 2nd wife of Charles Eames (died 1988)

Deaths
 February 8 – Constant-Désiré Despradelle, French architect and professor of architecture (born 1862)
 June 1 – Daniel Burnham, American architect and urban planner (born 1846)
 June 27 – Frank Furness, Philadelphia-based American architect (born 1839)
 November 17 – Richard Norman Shaw, British architect (born 1831)

References